Pierre-Alexandre Thomas Julien Landais (born August 6, 1981) is a film director, actor, producer and model, best known for The Aspern Papers, his feature film adaptation of Henry James' novel starring Jonathan Rhys-Meyers, Vanessa Redgrave and Joely Richardson.

Directing 
He has previously directed short films, fashion films, commercials and music videos starring French actors Nora Arnezeder, Marie-Anne Chazel, Andrea Ferreol, Alain-Fabien Delon, Sarah Biasini and Marie de Villepin, fashion icon Daphne Guinness and has collaborated with fashion brands and jewelers, like Boucheron. His films are featured on prestigious fashion magazines platforms like Vogue Italia, Madame Figaro or festivals like ASVOFF by Diane Pernet.

He has created his own production company Princeps Films and has completed filming in Venice his first feature film, The Aspern Papers (2018), which he also produced with Summerstorm Entertainment and Cohen Media Group, based on Jean Pavans' scenic adaptation of Henry James' novel, which Academy Award-winning screenwriter James Ivory is executive producing, and starring Jonathan Rhys-Meyers, Academy Award-winning actress Vanessa Redgrave, Joely Richardson, Jon Kortajarena, Poppy Delevingne, Morgane Polanski, Nicolas Hau and Barbara Meier.  The 75th Venice International Film Festival held a special screening of The Aspern Papers on the occasion of the Golden Lion for Lifetime Achievement award of the 2018 Venice Film Festival to Vanessa Redgrave.

Acting 
In 2010, he played the part of Christophe, alongside Emmanuelle Béart in Nous Trois directed by Renaud Bertrand. In 2011, he appeared as Maiwenn’s brother in her critically acclaimed film Polisse. He also played the leads in the short films he directed, Shakki (2012), a sci-fi short story opposite Daphne Guinness, Masque d’Or (2014) broadcast by Le Figaro, featuring a Samurai katana fight shot on location in the Grand Trianon of the Chateau de Versailles, inspired by Japanese Manga The Rose of Versailles and Saint Seiya, where he plays the villain Anthony opposite actress Marie de Villepin. He also played in Inside Me (2014) with Nora Arnezeder and Camellias (2015) opposite French actresses Marie-Anne Chazel and Andrea Ferreol.

Modelling 
Julien was the face of Jean-Paul Gaultier SS2002 campaign. He appeared in numerous high-end fashion magazines (Numero Homme, Uomo Vogue, Elle, The Fashionable Lampoon, Dazed & Confused, Commons&Sense... ) shot by celebrity photographers Jean-Baptiste Mondino, Satoshi Saikusa, Ellen Von Unwerth (who also captured the backstage on his first film Shakki with Daphne Guinness).

Filmography

Director 
 2012 Shakki (short) with Daphne Guinness, Andrea Ferreol and Sarah Biasini
 2013 Revolte - Stars are Falling (music video)
 2014 Masque d'Or (short) with Marie de Villepin, shot at the Grand Trianon of Versailles, for Le Figaro
 2014 Inside Me (short) with Nora Arnezeder
 2014 Der Doppelganger (short) with Alain-Fabien Delon and Diane Pernet for Vogue Italia
 2014 Parzival (short), adapted from Richard Wagner's Parsifal, with Emily Caillon and Thibault Theodore for Le Figaro
 2015 Echo (short) with Alexandre Cunha, Eva Doll and Gerhard Freidl. 
 2015 Camellias (short) with Marie-Anne Chazel and Andrea Ferreol
 2016 Black Flowers (short) with Diane Pernet
2018 The Aspern Papers with Jonathan Rhys Meyers, Joely Richardson and Vanessa Redgrave

Actor 
 2010 Just the Three of Us by Renaud Bertrand
 2011 Polisse by Maiwenn
 2012 Shakki (short)
 2014 Masque d'Or (short)
 2014 Inside Me (short)
 2015 Camellias (short)
 2016 Black Flowers (short)

References

External links 
 
 www.julienlandais.com
 www.princepsfilms.com

French directors
1981 births
Living people